Hezekiah Niles (October 10, 1777 – April 2, 1839), was an American editor and publisher of the Baltimore-based national weekly news magazine, Niles' Weekly Register (aka Niles' Register) and the Weekly Register.

Niles was born in Chester County, Pennsylvania, to a Quaker family, although his father quit the church to fight in the American Revolutionary War. In 1777, the family fled from Wilmington, Delaware, ahead of the British army to the home of James Jefferis on the east side of the Brandywine Creek near Jefferis' Ford. Niles later asserted in the Weekly Register that a Hessian mercenary threatened to bayonet his mother while pregnant with him.

The family returned to Wilmington and after the war his father rejoined the Quakers. At 17, Niles apprenticed with a Philadelphia printer for three years. He then worked in Wilmington for several years, attempting to establish a printing business that went bankrupt in 1801. In 1805 he published a short-lived literary magazine called the Apollo. Later in 1805, he moved to Baltimore, where until 1811 he edited a daily broadsheet, the Baltimore Evening Post, associated with the Democratic-Republican Party. In 1811, he issued the prospectus for the Weekly Register and had 1,500 subscribers before the first issue had been published.  His book Principles and acts of the Revolution in America was first published in 1822.

Niles edited and published the Weekly Register until 1836, making it into one of the most widely circulated magazines in the United States and himself into one of the most influential journalists of his day. The Niles' Weekly Register covered not only politics, but economics, science, technology, art, and literature.  In the Register's discourse of politics, Niles used what he called "magnanimous disputation", trying to present the arguments of both sides fairly and objectively, a policy which has made the paper an important source for the history of the period.

Later in life, Niles was afflicted by a paralytic condition and retired to Wilmington, Delaware, where he died in 1839.

Peacemaking efforts between the North and South 
Hezekiah foresaw the possibility of the American Civil War as early as 1820, and published articles in the Register which suggested efforts the South could make in modernizing their economy to a form which was not fully dependent on slavery, publishing efforts which he hoped would help avoid conflict between the North and South. Southern states largely rejected these suggestions that sought to alter their economic dependence on slavery.

Legacy 
Niles, Michigan and Niles, Ohio are named for him. Niles, Illinois may also be named for him, but circumstances are unclear concerning the naming of the surrounding township in 1850.

Bibliography 
 W.H. Earle. "Niles' Register, 1811-1849:  Window on the World," Journal of the War of 1812 and the Era 1800 to 1840,  Fall, 1996 (volume I, no. 5). online version
 Kovarik, William, "To Avoid the Coming Storm: Hezekiah Niles Weekly Register as a Voice of North-South Moderation, 1811 - 1836," American Journalism, Summer, 1992. online version  
 Kovarik, William, "Niles Register," Encyclopedia of American Journalism History" (Routledge, 2006). online version 
 Luxon,  Norval. Niles Weekly Register: News Magazine of the Nineteenth Century (Louisiana State University Press, 1947)
 Stone, Richard G. Hezekiah Niles as an Economist, (Johns Hopkins Press, 1933)

References

External links 
 Frederick N. Rasmussen Hezekiah Niles: A Patriotic News Magazine Editor in the 19th Century, Baltimore Sun, Sept. 4, 2011. 
Biographical Sketch of Hezekiah Niles from The History of Chester County by Futhey and Cope (1881)
 Niles Weekly Register fulltext
 David D. Fowler, Niles' Florida.   A five-volume compilation of news articles, personal letters, and anecdotes from early 19th century Florida.   Thirty-eight years of Florida’s history between 1811 and 1849 from the Niles’ Weekly Register.
 Hezekiah Niles on Find a Grave
  Principles and Acts of the Revolution in America; or an attempt to collect and preserve some of the speeches, orations and proceedings, with sketches and remarks on men and things, and other fugitive or neglected pieces of the revolutionary period.

1777 births
1839 deaths
American Quakers
American publishers (people)
American newspaper editors
Businesspeople from Baltimore
People from Chester County, Pennsylvania
Writers from Philadelphia
Writers from Wilmington, Delaware
Journalists from Pennsylvania